Eremolestes is a genus of beetles in the family Carabidae, containing the following species:

 Eremolestes fallax (Peyerimhoff, 1929)
 Eremolestes sulcatus (Chaudoir, 1876)

References

Lebiinae